The U.S. Army World Class Athlete Program (WCAP) is a military unit whose primary mission is to support nationally and internationally ranked soldiers in participating on the U.S. Olympic team. The program is headquartered at Fort Carson, Colorado.

Objectives
According to the U.S. Army, WCAP provides active duty, National Guard and reserve soldiers the opportunity to train and compete at national and international sports competitions with the ultimate goal of selection to the U.S. Olympic team and U.S. Paralympic team, while maintaining a professional military career and promoting the U.S. Army.

Selection
Any soldier-athlete (Active Duty, National Guard, Reserve) may apply for selection provided:
 Soldier is in good military standing
 The sport the soldier is applying for is an Olympic sport
 Soldier has completed Advanced Individual Training (enlisted) or Officer Basic Course (officer)
 Soldier meets sport specific entry standards, which normally consists of attaining a high national ranking or being selected to a U.S. National Team for international competition
 WCAP is not a developmental program; it targets athletes who have achieved world class status in their sport

WCAP Olympians

2022 
During the 2022 Winter Olympics in Beijing, China five soldier-athletes represented WCAP and the US Army in the XXIV Olympiad.

 Sgt. Emily Sweeney, Women's Singles Luge
 Sgt. Benjamin Loomis, Nordic Combined
 Sgt. Jasper Good, Nordic Combined
 Spc. Hakeem Abdul-Saboor, Two and Four-Man Bobsled
 Spc. Frank Del Duca, Two and Four-Man Bobsled

2020 
During the 2020 Summer Olympics in Tokyo, Japan twelve soldier-athletes represented WCAP and the US Army in the XXII Olympiad.

 Staff Sgt. Naomi Graham, Boxing
 Staff Sgt. Sandra Uptagrafft, Shooting
 1st Lt. Amber English, Shooting
 Staff Sgt. Nickolaus Mowrer, Shooting
 Sgt. 1st Class Elizabeth Marks, Paralympic Swimming
 Staff Sgt. Kevin Nguyen, Paralympic Shooting
 Staff Sgt. John Joss, Paralympic Shooting
 Sgt. Ildar Hafizov, Wrestling
 Spc. Alejandro Sancho, Wrestling
 Sgt. Amro Elgeziry, Modern Pentathlon
 Sgt. Samantha Schultz, Modern Pentathlon
 Spc. Benard Keter, Track and Field

2018
During the 2018 Winter Olympics in Pyeongchang, South Korea seven soldier-athletes represented WCAP and the US Army in the XXIII Olympiad.

 Maj Christopher Fogt, Two and Four-Man Bobsled
 Sgt. 1st Class Nate Weber, Four-Man Bobsled
 Sgt Nick Cunningham, Two and Four-Man Bobsled
 Sgt Justin Olsen, Two and Four-Man Bobsled
 Sgt Emily Sweeney, Women's Singles Luge
 Sgt Taylor Morris, Singles Luge
 Sgt Matthew Mortensen, Doubles Luge

2016

The program sent four Kenyan-born soldier-runners to compete at the Rio 2016 Summer Olympics.

 Sgt. Hillary Bor, 3,000 m steeplechase
 Spc. Paul Chelimo, 5,000 m run won the silver medal
 Spc. Shadrack Kipchirchir, 10,000 m run
 Spc. Leonard Korir, 10,000 m run
as well as
 Staff Sgt. John Nunn, 50 km racewalk

2012
The program sent seven athletes and four coaches to the London 2012 Summer Olympics.
 Sergeant First Class Dremiel Byers, Greco-Roman wrestling, 120 kg
 Sgt. 1st Class Keith Sanderson, rapid fire pistol
 Sgt. 1st Class Daryl Szarenski, pistol
 Staff Sgt. John Nunn, 50 km racewalk
 Spc. Justin Lester, Greco-Roman wrestling, 66 kg
 Sgt. Spenser Mango, Greco-Roman wrestling, 55 kg
 Spc. Dennis Bowsher, Modern Pentathlon

2010

During the 2010 Vancouver Winter Games three soldier-athletes and one coach represented WCAP and the US Army in the XXI Olympiad.

 SGT Jeremy Teela (Biathlon)
-10k Sprint
 SGT John Napier (Bobsled)
-4-man USA Sled II Pilot
 1LT Christopher Fogt (Bobsled)
-4-man USA Sled II Brakeman
 SGT William Tavares (Team USA Bobsled Coach)

2008
During the Beijing 2008 Summer Olympics two WCAP athletes and one coach represented WCAP and the US Army in the XXIX Olympiad:

 MAJ Michael Anti (Shooting)
-50m Rifle Competition
 SSG Dremiel Byers (Greco-Roman Wrestling)
-Heavyweight
 SSG Keith Sanderson (Shooting)
-Rapid Fire Pistol competition
 MAJ David Johnson (Team USA Shooting Coach)

Other notable WCAP alumni

 CPT Boyd Melson (Boxing)
-2004 World Military Boxing Championships, gold medal (69-kg. weight class)

References

Sources
 
 WCAP Selection Standards
 Eligibility and Application Procedures for the Army World Class Athlete Program
 US Army WCAP Official Website
 US Army Olympians
 Seven Soldiers, Alums, Make Team USA for Olympic Winter Games
 Army Regulation 215–1 Morale, Welfare, and Recreation

External links
 Army WCAP official website
 Family and MWR official website
 WCAP Track & Field team roster
 Army WCAP Official Image Archive
 Official Army WCAP Imagery
 Army WCAP official video
 US Army Installation Management Command
 United States Olympic Committee
 Olympic Games official website
 2012 London Olympic Games official website 

United States Army projects
Military sport in the United States